Linluo Township is a rural township in Pingtung County, Taiwan.

Administrative divisions
The township comprises seven villages: Linding, Linti, Linzhi, Tiandao, Tianxin, Tianzhong and Xintian.

Transportation
 TRA Linluo Station

Notable natives
 Chiou Lien-hui, Magistrate of Pingtung County (1981-1985)
 Ella Chen, member of S.H.E

References

External links

  Linluo Township Office 
 

Townships in Pingtung County